Porur Lake is located on the fringes of Porur in south-west Chennai and is a primary water resource for people residing in Chennai. It is a temporary catchment area connected with Chembarambakkam Lake. It is spread over 200 acres with a capacity of 46 million cubic feet (mcft).

There are four filters working 24x7 to pump water to K. K. Nagar double tank distribution point. Bathing, washing and/or swimming is currently prohibited in this lake from 1995. A better view of the lake can be appreciated from the Chennai bypass.

In 2012, the Water Resources Department initiated a project to increase the capacity the tank along with two other lakes in the city at a cost of  130 crore. This would deepen the lake by at least 1 m and increases the capacity to 70 mcft.

History
The lake was home to a large number of residential settlements prior to 2006, when the Government of Tamil Nadu ordered the demolition of these settlements as a part of its lake restoration initiative. The demolitions forced the eviction of about 10,700 families, some of whom were relocated to sites as far as Collector Nagar,
located in the Tiruvallur District, and Nallur, located in the Kancheepuram District.

Gallery

See also

Water management in Chennai

References 

 
 

Lakes of Tamil Nadu
Lakes of Chennai